High-Energy Replicated Optics (HERO) is a high-altitude balloon-borne x-ray telescope based at the Marshall Space Flight Center. Its mirrors are conical approximations to Wolter type 1 geometry. The proving flight, at least, used a high-pressure gas scintillation proportional counter with relatively low spatial resolution.

See also 
 High energy X-ray imaging technology
 X-ray astronomy

References

External links
 High energy replicated optics to explore the sun: Hard x-ray balloon-borne telescope (2013)

X-ray telescopes
Balloon-borne telescopes
Marshall Space Flight Center